Big Jim Patterson may refer to:
 Big Jim Patterson, trombonist of Dexys Midnight Runners
 Big Jim Patterson (cricketer) (born 1959), Irish cricketer
 Big Jim Patterson (Scottish footballer) (1928-2012)

See also
 Jim Patterson (disambiguation)